Howmeh Rural District is a rural district (dehestan) in the Central District of Sanandaj County, Kurdistan Province, Iran. At the 2006 census, its population was 31,304, in 7,720 families. The rural district has 22 villages.

References 

Rural Districts of Kurdistan Province
Sanandaj County